Myriopteron is a species of plants in the family Apocynaceae first described as a genus in 1844. It contains only one known species, Myriopteron extensum, native to Southeast Asia, India, and southern China. It can be found in Bangladesh.

References

Periplocoideae
Flora of China
Flora of tropical Asia
Monotypic Apocynaceae genera